André Jean Maurice Lacroix (24 September 1921 – 15 August 2016) was a French modern pentathlete. He competed at the 1948 and 1952 Summer Olympics.

References

External links
 

1921 births
2016 deaths
French male modern pentathletes
Olympic modern pentathletes of France
Modern pentathletes at the 1948 Summer Olympics
Modern pentathletes at the 1952 Summer Olympics